The HVDC Rihand–Delhi is a HVDC connection between Rihand and Dadri (near Delhi) in India, put into service in 1990.
It connects the 3,000 MW coal-based Rihand Thermal Power Station in Uttar Pradesh to the northern region of India. The transmission voltage is 500 kV and the maximum transmission power is 1,500 megawatts. The project was built by ABB.

On 24 June 1990, during the commissioning of the scheme, a complete quadrivalve of the Rihand converter station was destroyed, and the other two quadrivalves of the same pole badly damaged, by a fire which is believed to have started as a result of a loose connection on a grading capacitor. The fire was so intense that the valve hall was structurally damaged, and the affected converter was out of action for 18 months. Similar incidents on the Itaipu project in 1989 and the Sylmar Converter Station of the Pacific DC Intertie scheme in 1993 led to CIGRÉ publishing guidelines on the design of thyristor valves in order to reduce fire risks. In 1996 the National Fire Protection Association published NFPA 850{2} to further enhance fire prevention and protection guidelines base on input from the HVDC manufacturers and utility owners.  Since that time, there have been no catastrophic fire incidents in the US or internationally.

HVDC Rihand-Dadri crosses north of E. Manjhpati the HVDC Ballia-Bhiwadi. This is the first crossing of two independent HVDC lines in India and one of the few worldwide.

Sites

References

2. NFPA 850–2020, Recommended Practice for Fire Protection for Electric Generating Plants and High Voltage Direct Current Converter Stations

External links 

 Power Grid Corporation of India
 https://web.archive.org/web/20060218005213/http://www.abb.com/global/abbzh/abbzh251.nsf%21OpenDatabase%26db%3D/global/gad/gad02181.nsf%26v%3D17EA%26e%3Dus%26m%3D100A%26c%3DC1256D71001E0037C1256834002A779C
 https://web.archive.org/web/20051115122606/http://www.transmission.bpa.gov/cigresc14/Compendium/RIHAND.htm
 https://web.archive.org/web/20051115122606/http://www.transmission.bpa.gov/cigresc14/Compendium/Rihand%20Pictures.pdf

1990 establishments in Uttar Pradesh
HVDC transmission lines
Electric power transmission infrastructure in India
Energy in Uttar Pradesh
Energy infrastructure completed in 1990
20th-century architecture in India